Ion Dumeniuc (May 5, 1936 in Socii Noi – November 3, 1992 in Chişinău) was a scientist, editor, and politician from the Republic of Moldova. He was the founder of the Limba Română magazine.

Biography
Between September 1991 and November 3, 1992 Ion Dumeniuc served as Director General of the State Department of Languages.; Ion Ciocanu was his successor.

Ion Dumeniuc died on November 3, 1992. The sculptor Tudor Cataraga has created a sculpture on the grave of Ion Dumeniuc at the Central Orthodox Cemetery in Chişinău.

Honours
 Ion Dumeniuc Street in Chişinău

Works
 "Introducere în lingvistică" (1980)
 "Lingvistica generală" (1985),
 "Norme ortografice, ortoepice şi de punctuaţie ale limbii române" (1990)

References

External links 
 Ziarul de Garda, Un interviu de Aneta Grosu, Doua mirese ale profesorului Ion Dumeniuc
 Ion Dumeniuc
 Ion Dumeniuc

1936 births
Moldovan journalists
Male journalists
Moldovan writers
Moldovan male writers
Moldova State University alumni
People from Fălești District
1992 deaths
20th-century journalists